is a Japanese manga artist. He was born in Shinjuku. His books The Sex Philes, Blood the Last Vampire 2000, and Tokyo Akazukin have all been translated into English (although one of these is a fan translation).

Works 
 The Sex Philes (Eros Comix)
 Blood the Last Vampire 2000 (Kadokawa, Viz)
 Tokyo Red Hood (Gentosha)
 Necromanesque (Gentosha)

External links
 Benkyo Tamaoki's official English website

Living people
People from Shinjuku
Manga artists from Tokyo
Hentai manga artists
Year of birth missing (living people)